The 1954 Marshall Thundering Herd football team was an American football team that represented Marshall University in the Mid-American Conference (MAC) during the 1954 college football season. In its second season under head coach Herb Royer, the team compiled a 4–5 record (2–5 against conference opponents) and was outscored by a total of 214 to 203. Henry Hinte and Albie Maier were the team captains. The team played its home games at Fairfield Stadium in Huntington, West Virginia.

Schedule

References

Marshall
Marshall Thundering Herd football seasons
Marshall Thundering Herd football